Jacopo Guarnieri (born 14 August 1987) is an Italian professional road bicycle racer, who currently rides for UCI ProTeam .

Career
Guarnieri was born in Vizzolo Predabissi. In September 2014 it was announced that Guarnieri would join  from 2015 on a two-year contract, with the team's general manager Viatcheslav Ekimov emphasising Guarnieri's role as part of the lead-out train for Alexander Kristoff. He was named in the start list for the 2015 Tour de France. In the 2018 Tour de France he rode as a leadout man for Arnaud Démare, where he first assisted his teammate in surviving the high mountains of the 2nd and 3rd weeks and then launched Demare perfectly to claim the victory on stage 18. In May 2019, he was named in the startlist for the 2019 Giro d'Italia.

Major results

2005
 4th Road race, UCI Juniors World Championships
 8th Road race, UEC European Junior Road Championships
2007
 1st Trofeo Alcide Degasperi
 1st Circuito del Porto
 1st Stage 7 Olympia's Tour
 1st Stage 2b Giro del Veneto
 6th Road race, UEC European Under-23 Road Championships
2008
 1st ZLM Tour
 1st Stage 1 Giro delle Regioni
2009
 1st Stage 3 Tour de Pologne
 2nd Six Days of Fiorenzuola (with Bruno Risi)
 2nd Gran Premio della Costa Etruschi
 10th Vattenfall Cyclassics
2010
 1st Stage 1 Tour de Pologne
 2nd Giro del Friuli
 3rd Six Days of Fiorenzuola (with Danny Stam)
 4th Overall Circuit Franco-Belge
1st Stage 2
2011
 1st Six Days of Fiorenzuola (with Elia Viviani)
 1st Stage 3a Three Days of De Panne
 7th Gran Premio Nobili Rubinetterie
2012
 4th Grote Prijs Stad Zottegem
2016
 5th Paris–Bourges
 6th Gran Premio Bruno Beghelli
 8th Gent–Wevelgem

Grand Tour general classification results timeline

References

External links

1987 births
Living people
People from Vizzolo Predabissi
Italian male cyclists
Cyclists from the Metropolitan City of Milan